Luiz Gervazoni (22 May 1907 – 1963), known as Itália, was a Brazilian football player from Rio de Janeiro. He played for the Brazil national team in the 1930 FIFA World Cup finals.

Honours

Club
 Campeonato Carioca (3): 
Vasco da Gama: 1929, 1934, 1936

National
 Copa Río Branco (1): 
Brazil: 1932

References

External links

1907 births
1963 deaths
Footballers from Rio de Janeiro (city)
Brazilian footballers
Brazil international footballers
1930 FIFA World Cup players
Brazilian people of Italian descent
CR Vasco da Gama players
Association football defenders